Muskowekwan 85-33 is an Indian reserve of the Muskowekwan First Nation in Saskatchewan. It is 5 kilometres southwest of Lestock. In the 2016 Canadian Census, it recorded a population of 0 living in 1 of its 1 total private dwellings.

References

Indian reserves in Saskatchewan
Division No. 10, Saskatchewan